The discography of American country music artist Jana Kramer consists of two studio albums, 12 singles, three promotional singles, 10 music videos, and two album appearances. Kramer began her early career as a television actress, appearing in various soap operas and syndicated shows. In 2011, she signed a recording contract following the exposure of a recurring role on the television series One Tree Hill.

Kramer's self-titled studio album was released in June 2012 on Elektra Records Nashville. The album debuted at number 19 on the Billboard 200 and number five on the Top Country Albums chart. "Why Ya Wanna" was the project's lead single, becoming her first major hit as a musical artist. The song peaked at number three on the Billboard Hot Country Songs chart and the top 50 of the Billboard Hot 100, certifying Platinum by the Recording Industry Association of America as well. "Whiskey" and "I Hope It Rains" were the next singles respectfully spawned from the album, both reaching minor positions on the Billboard country songs chart.

Her next single was released in May 2014 entitled "Love". Reaching the top 40 of the Hot Country Songs chart, the song promoted the release of her second studio album. Due to the song's lack of success, the album's release date was delayed in 2014. "I Got the Boy" was issued as Kramer's next single in January 2015 and was co-written by Jamie Lynn Spears. Her second studio album Thirty-One was officially released in October 2015, debuting at number 10 on the Billboard 200 and number three on the Top Country Albums chart.

Albums

Studio albums

Singles

As lead artist

Promotional singles

Other charted songs

Music videos

Other appearances

References

External links 
 Official Website
 Jana Kramer discography at Discogs

Discographies of American artists
Country music discographies